Gomdar Gewog (Dzongkha: སྒོམ་དར་) is a gewog (village block) of Samdrup Jongkhar District, Bhutan.

References 

Gewogs of Bhutan
Samdrup Jongkhar District